Kirinda Puhulwella Divisional Secretariat is a  Divisional Secretariat of Matara District, of Southern Province, Sri Lanka.

Kirinda is multi-racial division, where Sinhalese people and Muslims live together. At some point in the past, Yonaka businessmen came to the district and married Sinhala women and settled there. The division's total population was 22,036 in 2010 ; 11,146 were female and 10,890 were male. There were 21,268 Sinhalese and 768 Lanka Yonaka people.

References

External links
 Divisional Secretariats Portal
History of Kirinda Puhulwella Divisional Secretariat Ministry of Home Affairs

Divisional Secretariats of Matara District